Cyril Edward Robinson (1884  1981) was an English historian, writer and teacher at Winchester College in Hampshire. He is the author of a number of works on ancient Greece and Rome.

Life
Robinson was born in Bury St. Edmunds, UK, in 1884. The son of a clergyman, he excelled in his studies at both Marlborough college and Magdalen college, Oxford, earning distinctions at both. In 1909 he became a teacher at Winchester College, Hampshire, UK, where he remained until his retirement in 1945.

Works

 Cyril Edward Robinson (1917), The Days of Alkibiades, E. Arnold.
 Cyril E. Robinson (1929), A History of Greece, Methuen.
 Cyril E. Robinson (1930), England, a History of British Progress from the Early Ages to the Present Day, Thomas Y. Crowell.
 Cyril Edward Robinson, P.G.Hunter (1938), Roma, Cambridge University Press.
 Robinson, CE (1940), Latinum: A Reader for the First Stage of Latin , Cambridge University Press. 
 Cyril E. Robinson (1941), A History of Rome from 753 B.C. to A.D. 410, Methuen.
 C.E.Robinson (1946), Zito Hellas: A Popular History of Ancient Greece, Chapman & Hall.
 Cyril E. Robinson (1948), Hellas: A Short History of Ancient Greece, Pantheon Books.
 Cyril E. Robinson (1952), A History of the Roman republic, Methuen.
 Cyril E. Robinson (1965), History of Rome, Thomas Y Crowell.
 Cyril E. Robinson (1978), Everyday Life in Ancient Greece, Praeger.
 C.E. (Cyril Edward) Robinson (2012), A History of England, Early and Middle Ages to 1485, HardPress Publishing.

References

External links 
 Cyril Edward Robinson on LibraryThing.
 Books by Cyril E. Robinson on Goodreads.
 Books by Cyril E. Robinson on Amazon.com.

English historians
1884 births
1981 deaths